The 2010 Mid-Eastern Athletic Conference women's basketball tournament took place March 9–13, 2010, at the Lawrence Joel Veterans Memorial Coliseum in Winston-Salem, North Carolina. The tournament champion, The Hampton University Lady Pirates, received an automatic berth to the NCAA Division I women's basketball tournament. The 2009-2010 MEAC regular season champions, The North Carolina A&T Lady Aggies, earned the No. 1 seed and an early round bye.

Bracket

References

MEAC tournament
MEAC women's basketball tournament
Basketball competitions in Winston-Salem, North Carolina
College basketball tournaments in North Carolina
Women's sports in North Carolina